Alister Earl Hewitson Hughes (21 January 1919 – 28 February 2005) was a Grenadian journalist and poet.

He was born on 21 January 1919 in St. Georges, Grenada, and died on 28 February 2005. He was the Editor of the Grenada Newsletter from 1972 to 1994.

References

External links
Caldwell Thomas, "Remembering Alister Hughes", Big Drum Nation, 2 March 2005.
Grenada Newsletter in the Digital Library of the Caribbean (dLOC)

1919 births
2005 deaths
Grenadian literature
Grenadian journalists
Grenadian poets
Maria Moors Cabot Prize winners
People from St. George's, Grenada
Grenadian male writers
Male poets
20th-century poets
20th-century male writers
20th-century journalists